The High Country Tour is an ongoing concert tour by American heavy metal band The Sword. Staged in support of the band's 2015 fifth studio album High Country, the tour is scheduled to visit venues worldwide in 2015 and 2016. Currently comprising three legs and 75 shows, the tour began in Trondheim, Norway at the Pstereo Festival on August 21, 2015 and the latest scheduled show is on December 19, 2015 in Corpus Christi, Texas.

Background
The opening European leg of the High Country Tour was detailed in tandem with the official announcement of the album on June 2, 2015, with the news also stating that the band would continue touring throughout 2015 and 2016. A few days before the release of the album and the beginning of the tour, two legs of North American dates were added starting on October 9, 2015 in Dallas, including appearances at the festivals Knotfest and Aftershock; support acts were announced as Kadavar and All Them Witches for the first leg, and Royal Thunder for the second.

Set list
The following is the set list from a number of early shows on the tour.

"Empty Temples"
"Tres Brujas"
"Cloak of Feathers"
"High Country"
"Tears Like Diamonds"
"Mist & Shadow"
"Seven Sisters"
"Freya"

"The Horned Goddess"
"The Dreamthieves"
"Lawless Lands"
"Buzzards"
"Dying Earth"
Encore
"Suffer No Fools"
"Maiden, Mother & Crone"

Tour dates

References

External links
The Sword tour dates

2015 concert tours
The Sword concert tours